Knechtel is a surname. Notable people with the surname include:

Larry Knechtel
Wilhelm Knechtel